Yuan Yechun (born 21 March 1997), also known as Carl Yuan, is a Chinese professional golfer. He competed in the 2020 Summer Olympics.

Yuan has become well-known for his unusual style and in particular his unique follow through.

Amateur career
Yuan played college golf at the University of Washington for three years. While at Washington, he won the Pacific Northwest Amateur in 2016.

Yuan competed in the 2018 Asian Games. He place tied for 10th in the men's individual competition and took silver in the men's team event alongside Jin Cheng, Chen Yilong, and Zhang Huachuang.

Professional career
Yuan turned professional in 2018. He competed on the PGA Tour China in 2018 and won the Qingdao Championship. Since 2019, he has played on the Korn Ferry Tour. He has three runner-up finishes on the Korn Ferry Tour: 2020 Pinnacle Bank Championship, 2020 WinCo Foods Portland Open, and 2021 Simmons Bank Open.

Yuan qualified for the 2020 Tokyo Olympics and finished tied for 38th in the men's individual competition.

Amateur wins
2013 Junior All-Star at Mission Inn, Scott Robertson Memorial, Beijing Junior Open
2015 China Team Championship
2016 Pacific Northwest Amateur, China Team Championship

Source:

Professional wins (2)

Korn Ferry Tour wins (1)

Korn Ferry Tour playoff record (1–0)

PGA Tour China wins (1)

Results in World Golf Championships

"T" = tied

See also
2022 Korn Ferry Tour Finals graduates

References

External links

Chinese male golfers
PGA Tour golfers
Golfers at the 2020 Summer Olympics
Olympic golfers of China
Asian Games medalists in golf
Washington Huskies men's golfers
Korn Ferry Tour graduates
People from Lake Mary, Florida
Sportspeople from Dalian
1997 births
Living people
20th-century Chinese people
21st-century Chinese people